Antoni Abad i Roses (born 1956 in Lleida) is a Spanish artist. He began his career as a sculptor, and evolved over time towards video art and later in net.art and other forms of new media.

Biography 
Abad was born in 1956 in Lleida, Spain. Abad's artistic training began with the teachings of his father, followed by a degree in Art History from the University of Barcelona (1979), and studies of engraving in Cuenca, London and Perugia.

Art career
His work has evolved away from a traditional sculptural practice to the use of new technologies, and in particular the creation of community-based artworks using cell phones. He moved also from photography to video art, followed by interest in computers Net.art. He uses Internet as a creative & research platform. Antoni Abad's expresses the desire to formal experimentation around the concepts of space and time, always present in his work, not exempt lately of certain ironic and critical aspects.

Exhibitions
Some of his most important exhibits:
 1986 — Espai 10 (Fundació Joan Miró) Escultures mal·leables
 1991 — Premi d'Arts Plàstiques Medalla Morera. Museu d'Art Jaume Morera. June
 1997 — Medidas de emergencia. Espacio Uno, Museo Nacional Centro de Arte Reina Sofía, Madrid.
 1999 — Museo de Arte Moderno de Buenos Aires &  Venice Biennale.
 2003 — The Real Royal Trip. P.S.1. – Museum of Modern Art, New York.
 2006 — Centre d'Art Santa Mònica, Barcelona.
 2014 — megafone.net/2004-2014, MACBA.
 2017 — Venice Biennale.

Awards 
 Premi d'Arts Plàstiques Medalla Morera (medal) 1990
 Premi Ciutat de Barcelona (City of Barcelona Prize) in the category of Multimedia (2002) for his work Z, shown in Metrònom and Centre d'Art Santa Monica
 Golden Nica at Ars Electronica within the category of virtual communities in 2006. Considered the most important prize in the world in terms of art and new technologies. 
 Premi Nacional d'Arts Visuals (National Prize for Visual Arts) in 2006 given by the Government of Catalonia.

References 

Artists from Catalonia
People from Lleida
1956 births
Living people
Spanish video artists
University of Barcelona alumni
Spanish contemporary artists